The Cabox is the highest mountain on the island of Newfoundland, located on the western part of the island near the coastal town of Stephenville.

See also
 Mountain peaks of Canada

References

Cabox, The